Yang Zhenduo (1926 – 7 November 2020), a native of Yongnian, Hebei, was born in Beijing, China, into the famous Yang family of martial artists. A son of Yang Cheng Fu and a great-grandson of Yang Lu Chan (the creator of the Yang style of t'ai chi ch'uan), Yang Zhenduo was a fourth-generation descendant of the Yang Family of t'ai chi ch'uan, and was the fourth lineage-holder of the style.

Biography
Yang Zhenduo began studying the soft style martial art of t'ai chi ch'uan (taijiquan) at age 6 with his father, and continued studying with his elder brothers Yang Zhen Ming (Shou Zhong), Yang Zhen Ji, and his younger brother Yang Zhen Guo after his father died. Studious, patient, modest and unassuming like his father, he possessed a consummate martial arts skill. He has the deep admiration and esteem of t'ai chi ch'uan enthusiasts worldwide. Yang Zhenduo carried on the aspirations of his ancestors and has dedicated his life to the spread and popularization of the style. He has promoted Yang style t'ai chi ch'uan in order to expand the ties of friendship between the citizens of China and the rest of the world.

He has lived in Taiyuan, Shanxi Province, China, since 1960, teaching the large frame of the Yang-style t'ai chi ch'uan, and has been invited many times to teach and hold seminars in many countries around the world.

He served as vice-president of the Shanxi Wushu Association since 1980. In 1982 he founded and served as president of the Shanxi Yang Style Tai Chi Chuan Association, and was its honorary lifetime president. This association has now grown to over 30,000 members throughout the Province and is the largest martial arts organization of its kind in China. In October 1998 Yang Zhenduo founded the International Yang Style Tai Chi Chuan Association, serving as its chairman of the board. Under his leadership, the association has now grown to 28 centers in 12 countries with more than 2000 members worldwide.

In 1996 the Chinese Wushu Academy recognized Yang Zhenduo as one of the Top 100 Wushu Masters in China
. That same year he received the honor of being proclaimed Honorary Resident by the mayor of San Antonio, Texas, and in 1997 he received the Golden Key to the City of Troy, Michigan from its mayor.

Yang Zhenduo has appeared several times on the covers of T'ai Chi Magazine and other martial arts publications. He has authored many articles and written books on the study of t'ai chi ch'uan, as well as produced 3 complete sets of teaching videos of the art.

While retaining his position as chairman of the International Yang Style Tai Chi Chuan Association until his death, Yang Zhenduo retired from his regular teaching activities, his position as president of the association, and appointed his student Yang Jun, his grandson, as its new president to continue his work.

In July 2009, at the First International Tai Chi Chuan Symposium, Grandmaster Yang Zhenduo announced that Master Yang Jun is the fifth lineage-holder of the Traditional Yang-style t'ai chi ch'uan.

Disciples
Grandmaster Yang Zhenduo acknowledged the following people as his Disciples. These individuals have studied and promoted the Yang-style t'ai chi ch'uan for many years.

 Hu Buyun,              胡步云
 Yang Yongfen,          杨永芬
 Guo Jiansheng,         郭建生
 Ge Jingang,            戈金刚
 Xie Wende,             谢文德
 Wang Dexing,           王德星
 Gao Junsheng,          高俊生
 Zhang Suzhen,          张素珍
 Yang Liru,             杨礼儒
 Miao Guangzhao,        苗光照
 Li Chunhou,            李存厚
 Sun Gangchen,          孙刚臣
 Cheng Xiangyun,        程相云
 Yang Chunru,           杨春如
 Zhou Yazhen,           周亚珍
 Lin Qiuya (Malaysia),  林秋雅（马来西亚）
 Wang Wen,              王 文
 Zhang Guiying,         张桂英
 Hua Xiaolong,          滑小龙
 Mei Mei Teo (Sweden),  张美美（瑞典）
 Duan Yinglian,         段英莲
 Li Shoutang,           李寿堂
 Li Xiuying,            李秀英
 Han Hoong Wang (USA),  王涵蓉（美国）
 Yan Fengxiang,         阎凤祥
 Jia  Chengping,        贾承平
 Li Qimei,              李七梅
 Qiao Rongjian,         乔荣建
 Tian Xianwen,          田宪文
 Song Bin,              宋 斌
 Geng Ying,             耿 英
 Yang Wenshen,          杨文升
 Luo Haiping,           罗海平
 Yao Junfang,           药俊芳
 Wang Baixuan,          王白玄
 Jian Guiyan,           简桂妍
 Liang Xiufang,         梁秀芳
 Niu Xinzhong,          牛新中
 Li Tiancai,            李天才
 Andy Lee
 Bill Walsh
 Dave Barrett
 Frank Grothstruck
 Jean-Marc Geering
 Andre Leray

See also
 103-form Yang family tai chi chuan (Long Form)
 Two-person Pushing Hands

References

External links
 International Yang Family Tai Chi Chuan Association

Chinese tai chi practitioners
Sportspeople from Beijing
1926 births
2020 deaths